MOA-2011-BLG-262L is an astronomical object of uncertain nature with an orbiting companion, detected through the gravitational microlensing event MOA-2011-BLG-262 in the constellation Sagittarius. The discovery team considers the latter scenario to be more likely.

References

Sagittarius (constellation)
Red dwarfs
Rogue planets
Astronomical objects discovered in 2013
Gravitational lensing